Natural killer T (NKT) cells are a heterogeneous group of T cells that share properties of both T cells and natural killer cells. Many of these cells recognize the non-polymorphic CD1d molecule, an antigen-presenting molecule that binds self and foreign lipids and glycolipids. They constitute only approximately 1% of all peripheral blood T cells. Natural killer T cells should neither be confused with natural killer cells nor killer T cells (cytotoxic T cells).

Nomenclature
The term "NK T cells" was first used in mice to define a subset of T cells that expressed the natural killer (NK) cell-associated marker NK1.1 (CD161). It is now generally accepted that the term "NKT cells" refers to CD1d-restricted T cells, present in mice and humans, some of which coexpress a heavily biased, semi-invariant T-cell receptor and NK cell markers.

Molecular characterization
NKT      cells are a subset of T cells that coexpress an αβ T-cell receptor, but also express a variety of molecular markers that are typically associated with NK cells, such as NK1.1. The best-known NKT cells differ from conventional αβ T cells in that their T-cell receptors are far more limited in diversity ('invariant' or 'type 1' NKT). They and other CD1d-restricted T cells ('type 2' NKT) recognize lipids and glycolipids presented by CD1d molecules, a member of the CD1 family of antigen-presenting molecules, rather than peptide-major histocompatibility complexes (MHCs). As such, NKT cells are important in recognizing glycolipids from organisms such as Mycobacterium, which causes tuberculosis.

NKT cells include both NK1.1+ and NK1.1−, as well as CD4+, CD4−, CD8+ and CD8− cells. Natural killer T cells can share other features with NK cells, as well, such as CD16 and CD56 expression and granzyme production.

Invariant natural killer T (iNKT) cells express high levels of and are dependent on the transcriptional regulator promyelocytic leukemia zinc finger  for their development.

Classification
Classification of natural killer T cells into three groups has been proposed:

Invariant NKT (iNKT) cells
The best-known subset of CD1d-dependent NKT cells expresses an invariant T-cell receptor (TCR) α chain. These are referred to as type I or invariant NKT cells (iNKT) cells. They are notable for their ability to respond rapidly to danger signals and pro-inflammatory cytokines. Once activated, they engage in effector functions, like NK transactivation, T cell activation and differentiation, B cell activation, dendritic cell activation and cross-presentation activity, and macrophage activation.

iNKT cells recognize lipid antigens presented by CD1d, a non-polymorphic major histocompatibility complex class I-like antigen presenting molecule. These cells are conserved between humans and mice. The highly conserved TCR is made of Va24-Ja18 paired with Vb11 in humans, which is specific for glycolipid antigens. The best known antigen of iNKT cells is alpha-galactosylceramide (αGalCer), which is a synthetic form of a chemical purified from the deep sea sponge Agelas mauritianus. iNKT cells develop in the thymus, and distribute to the periphery. They are most commonly found in the liver, but are also found in the thymus, spleen, peripheral blood, bone marrow and fat tissue. In comparison to mice, humans have fewer iNKT cells and have a wide variation in the amount of circulating iNKT cells.

Currently, there are five major distinct iNKT cell subsets. These subset cells produce a different set of cytokines once activated. The subtypes iNKT1, iNKT2 and iNKT17 mirror Th Cell subsets in cytokine production. In addition there are subtypes specialized in T follicular helper-like function and IL-10 dependent regulatory functions. Once activated iNKT cells can impact the type and strength of an immune response. They engage in cross talk with other immune cells, like dendritic cells, neutrophils and lymphocytes. Activation occurs by engagement with their invariant TCR. iNKT cells can also be indirectly activated through cytokine signaling.

While iNKT cells are not very numerous, their unique properties makes them an important regulatory cell that can influence how the immune system develops. They are known to play a role in chronic inflammatory diseases like autoimmune disease, asthma and metabolic syndrome. In human autoimmune diseases, their numbers are decreased in peripheral blood. It is not clear whether this is a cause or effect of the disease. Absence of microbe exposure in early development led to increased iNKT cells and immune morbidity in a mouse model.

Function
Upon activation, NKT cells are able to produce large quantities of interferon gamma, IL-4, and granulocyte-macrophage colony-stimulating factor, as well as multiple other cytokines and chemokines (such as IL-2, IL-13, IL-17, IL-21, and TNF-alpha).

NKT cells recognize protected microbial lipid agents which are presented by CD1d-expressing antigen presenting cells. This serves as a pathway for NKT cells to fight against infections and enhance the humoral immunity. The NKT cells provide support and help to B cells which act as a microbial defense and aid in targeting for B-cell vaccines.

Significance
NKT cells seem to be essential for several aspects of immunity because their dysfunction or deficiency has been shown to lead to the development of autoimmune diseases such as diabetes, autoinflammatory diseases such as atherosclerosis, and cancers. NKT cells have recently been implicated in the disease progression of human asthma.

The clinical potential of NKT cells lies in the rapid release of cytokines (such as IL-2, IFN-gamma, TNF-alpha, and IL-4) that promote or suppress different immune responses.

Most clinical trials with NKT cells have been performed with cytokine-induced killer cells (CIK).

See also
 Cytotoxic T cell (killer T cell)

References

External links
 NKT cell Journal Screening
 Nature glossary on murine NKT cells
 Nature Reviews Web Focus on regulatory lymphocytes

T cells
Human cells
Lymphocytes
Immunology
Immune system